Benjamin or Ben Stephenson may refer to:
Benjamin C. Stephenson (1766–1839), English courtier
Benjamin Franklin Stephenson, founder of the Grand Army of the Republic
Benjamin Stephenson (politician) (1769–1822), American politician
Benjamin Robert Stephenson (1835–1890), Canadian lawyer and politician
B. C. Stephenson (1839–1906), English composer
Ben Stephenson, Anglo-American television executive

See also
Ben Stevenson (disambiguation)
Stephenson Grand Army of the Republic Memorial, also known as Dr. Benjamin F. Stephenson, a 1907 public artwork in Washington, D.C.